The 1st Africa Hockey5s World Cup Qualifier was the one edition of the Africa Hockey5s World Cup Qualifier for the men's Hockey5s event at the FIH Hockey5s World Cup. It was held alongside the women's tournament in Ismailia, Egypt from 10–15 December 2022.

The winner of the tournament qualified for the 2024 Hockey5s World Cup.

Teams

Results

Third place game

Final

Goalscorers

Final standing

See also
2022 Women's Africa Hockey5s World Cup Qualifier

Notes

References

FIH Hockey5s World Cup
Africa Hockey5s World Cup Qualifier
Africa Hockey5s World Cup Qualifier
International sports competitions hosted by Egypt
Africa Hockey5s World Cup Qualifier